William Arthur Branville McCartney or Branville McCartney (born May 6, 1967) is a Bahamian politician and Barrister of the Inner Temple. Mr McCartney is one of the founders of and the leader of the Democratic National Alliance. He previously served in the Cabinet of the third Ingraham administration, but resigned before the 2012 general elections were called. McCartney is a graduate of Kingsway Academy's class of 1985 and of Holborn College's class of 1989. He holds and LLB Honours Degree and was subsequently admitted to the Bar of England and Wales as well as the Bar of the Commonwealth of the Bahamas in 1990. In 2000 McCartney started his own law firm, Halsbury Law which hosts an annual free legal clinic, the only one in the country opened to the general public.

He was appointed to the Senate in 2016 and was very briefly Leader of the Opposition there in 2017.

References

Members of the House of Assembly of the Bahamas
Government ministers of the Bahamas
Democratic National Alliance (Bahamas) politicians
People from Nassau, Bahamas
1967 births
Living people
20th-century Bahamian lawyers
21st-century Bahamian lawyers